Joseph Gutteridge (23 March 1816 – 4 November 1899) was an English silk weaver and naturalist.

Gutteridge became an atheist after attending debates at the Coventry Mutual Improvement Society, and became an Owenite socialist. After participating in the strike of 1860-61 in the aftermath of the Cobden–Chevalier Treaty, he acquired "firm Liberal views". Despite being ruined by the Treaty, he was "dogmatically committed to free trade as the poor man's best hope".

In 1893 his autobiography Lights and Shadows in the Life of an Artisan was published, which was drawn from his diary. It "remains an impressive source for the history of the silk industry, working-class life, and urban development during the industrial revolution". William Ewart Gladstone received a copy and it gained favourable reviews. Gutteridge received a gift from the Royal Bounty Fund and an annuity from friends.

Work

Notes

Further reading
V. E. Chancellor (ed.), Master and Artisan in Victorian England (1969)
Joseph Gutteridge, Lights and Shadows in the Life of an Artisan (1893).

1816 births
1899 deaths
English naturalists
English atheists
Owenites
Utopian socialists